The Canadian Forces Military Police (CFMP) provide police, security and operational support services to the Canadian Armed Forces (CAF) and the Department of National Defence (DND) worldwide.

About
CFMP serves the CF community, which includes Regular and Reserve Force members, DND civilian employees, cadets, and family members residing on military establishments in Canada and abroad. Whether at home on CF bases or abroad on international missions, CFMP, in conjunction with civilian and allied military police forces, protect and support all components of the CF. CFMP has over 1,250 full-time members.

The international scope of the CF requires that CFMP provide services in Canada and around the world. All Canadian citizens are entitled to the same rights, privileges and protection under Canadian law, and CFMP are qualified to provide these services to the same standard as every other Canadian police service. CFMP routinely function within the civilian criminal and military justice systems.

CFMP are classified as Peace Officers in the Criminal Code, which gives them the same powers as civilian law enforcement personnel to enforce Acts of Parliament anywhere. They have the power to arrest anyone who is subject to the Code of Service Discipline (CSD), regardless of position or rank under the National Defence Act (NDA). CFMP have the power to arrest and charge non-CSD bound civilians only in cases where a crime is committed on or in relation to DND property or assets, or at the request of the Minister of Public Safety, Commissioner of the Correctional Service of Canada or Commissioner of the Royal Canadian Mounted Police (RCMP). Although CFMP jurisdiction is only on DND property across Canada and throughout the world, any civilian accessing these areas falls under CFMP jurisdiction and is dealt with in the same manner as by any civilian policing agency. If in fact a crime is committed on or in relation to DND property or assets, CFMP have the power to arrest and charge the offender, military or civilian, under the Criminal Code. It is important to note though that the purpose of the CFMP is not to replace the job of a civilian police officer, but rather to support the CF through security and policing services. CFMP also have the power to enforce the Provincial Highway Traffic Act on all military bases in Canada pursuant to the Government Property Traffic Regulations (GPTR).

History

The Canadian Military Police Branch can trace its roots to the formation of the Canadian Military Police Corps (CMPC), which was authorized on September 15, 1917, by Militia General Orders 93 & 94. The initial establishment was set at 30 Officers and 820 Warrant Officers and NCOs within 13 detachments, designated No. 1 through No. 13.

Only trained soldiers were to be selected and they were required to serve a one-month probationary period before being transferred. Applicants were required to have exemplary service records. The CMPC School was formed at CFB Rockcliffe near Ottawa in June 1918. The first commanding officer of the school was Major Baron Osborne. The basic course was of three weeks duration. Upon successful completion of the course, Privates were promoted to Lance Corporal. The CMPC was disbanded on December 1, 1920. The Canadian Provost Corps (C Pro C) was formed on June 15, 1940, under the authority of Privy Council Order 67/3030. It originally consisted of No.1 Company (RCMP) and No. 2 Provost Company which was formed in early 1940 as part of the 2nd Canadian Infantry Division.

The Royal Air Force, Canada (RAFC) was formed in 1918 and an Assistant Provost Marshal was appointed in Toronto on February 1 of that year. Initially, there were approximately 30 Royal Air Force NCOs and airmen on his staff. This number was soon increased to 50, and two officers were appointed as Deputy Assistant Provost Marshals. The Royal Canadian Air Force Police had its beginnings in March 1940 when Group Captain M.M. Sisley was appointed as the first Provost Marshal of the RCAF. Originally called the Guards and Discipline Branch, the name was changed a year later to the Directorate of Provost and Security Services (DPSS). The DPSS was subdivided into two branches: Police and Security. These branches supplied gate and perimeter security for airfields and installations, and conducted disciplinary patrols. During the Second World War, RCAF Police were known as RCAF Service Police (SP).

After World War II, but before the unification of the Royal Canadian Navy (RCN), the Canadian Army and the Royal Canadian Air Force (RCAF), the security and police functions were conducted quite differently by the three Services. The Army divided the responsibility for security and security incidents between the Canadian Intelligence Corps (C Int C) and C Pro C and field inquiries were conducted by the Security Sections of the C Int C. The police functions of the C Pro C involved the provision and supervision of guards, the operation of Service Detention barracks and investigation of service and criminal offences. The Air Force Police (AFP) had the dual responsibility of performing both police and security duties and were under the command of the base on which they served.

Security in the RCN was the responsibility of the Assistant Director Naval Intelligence who reported to the Director of Naval Headquarters. With the exception of a very small group of professional Policing Canada's Military since 1917 security officers, naval security officers were primarily Intelligence Officers or officers assigned security duties as a secondary responsibility. The navy had no police organization comparable to the C Pro C or the AFP but relied upon Dockyard Police, Corps of Commissionaires, local Civil Police and shore patrols to maintain security of establishments and maintenance of discipline. Field inquiries in support of the security program were conducted by the RCMP.

The initial amalgamation of all police and security elements of the CF was first effected in October 1964 by the formation of the Directorate of Security at Canadian Forces Headquarters. With the introduction of the forces Functional Command structure in April 1966, the security staffs and PMs in existing single service command organizations were eliminated, the command and base security officers were appointed at the newly formed HQs and the various investigative elements of the Services were amalgamated into a single organization called the Special Investigation Unit (SIU). To achieve a common approach throughout the forces, security and police functions were regrouped into three main categories: (1) personnel security, (2) police and custody, and (3) security of information and materiel. A single trade of Military Police was created which replaced five trades that previously existed and provided standards for the training required of all non-commissioned members employed in the police and security field. In June 1966, Major General Gilles Turcot was directed to examine the role, organization and responsibility for Security in the CF and to make recommendations for any revisions.

At the time of the Turcot report, there existed two philosophies in the Police, Intelligence and Security organizations. The Director General Intelligence (DGI) saw a distinction between Police and Security but with a closer relationship between Security and Intelligence. The Chief of Personnel saw the Police and Security functions as complementary. The Turcot report, completed on 22 July 1966 directed that the responsibility for Security should be placed under the DGI. In January 1967, the Chief of the Defence Staff (CDS) directed DGI to undertake a management analysis with a view to recommending the future management system for Intelligence, Security and Military Police in the Canadian Armed Forces.

This study became known as the Piquet report. The DGI Working Group submitted its study in March 1967 in which it was concluded that security/intelligence/police should be managed as an entity under a Directorate General Intelligence and Security in the Vice Chief of the Defence Staff (VCDS) Branch. The new Branch was to be named the Security Branch, which officially was created on 1 February 1968. The recommendations of the Piquet Study were implemented by the CDS on 3 May 1967 and by 1968, the Officer specifications were in draft form and included five sub-classifications: Military Police, Investigation, Intelligence, Imagery Interpretation and Interrogation. With the formation of a unified Branch came a need to replace the previous corps and service badges and the use of the thunderbird as the symbol for the Security Branch arose out of the recommendations of the Insignia Steering Group appointed by DGI on 15 May 1967. In 1970, the branch unofficially deleted the Military Police sub-classification at the officer level since the Basic Officer Specifications included all the tasks of the sub-classification. In effect, the Branch had adopted a four subclassification structure. Therefore, between 1971 and 1974, the new Security Services Basic Officer course was the Branch qualifying course and consisted of 84 days devoted to police/security instruction and three days to Intelligence subjects.

In June 1975, the Director Military Occupational Structures (DMOS) issued a draft occupational analysis report on the Sec 81 classification in which it was found that the activities performed by Sec(Int) officers bore little resemblance to those performed by Sec(MP) officers. The Branch was restructured into two classifications vice the five sub-classifications that existed at the time. By August 1975 after another review, DGIS rejected the idea of two separate classifications within one Security Branch and proposed one classification for Police and one for Intelligence. After 1976, training and employment of Security Branch Officers was in consonance with the dual structure of the Branch and proved superior to the pre-1975 approaches. The dual structure also formalized and clearly defined the uniqueness of the Police and Intelligence functions and institutionalized the security function in the police side of the structure as had been the RCAF practice. In 1978, the Craven Report, proposed that ADM(PER) separate the CF Police and Intelligence personnel comprising the unified Security Branch and reorganize them independently into a structured Security Branch and a new Intelligence Branch. Following further studies, discussions and recommendations, DGIS concurred with the CRAVEN Report and on 3 December 1981 the CDS directed that separate Security and Intelligence Branches each containing the applicable officer classification and trade be established, with an implementation target date of 1 October 1982. On 29 October 1982, a ceremony was held at the Canadian Forces School of Intelligence and Security (CFSIS) which inaugurated the new Intelligence Branch and rededicated the Security Branch.

Following the recommendations in the report by former Chief Justice Brian Dickson, a new era has been inaugurated for the Military Police Branch with the creation of; the Canadian Forces National Investigation Service (CFNIS), the Canadian Forces National Counter Intelligence Unit (CFNCIU) and the reestablishment of the Canadian Forces Provost Marshal (CFPM).

Currently, members of the Military Police Branch, serve on every base and station of the Canadian Forces in Canada, as well as with the various regiments and battalions. CFMP also serve at Royal Military College of Canada, JTF 2, Joint Task Force (North) and as Air Marshals for Code 1 (PM Canada, HEGG and Royal Family) when traveling outside Canada. CFMP continue to serve in support of deployed operations, with a significant presence in TF Afghanistan. Outside Canada locations also include the NATO E3A component in Geilenkirchen, Germany, 45 Embassies and High Commissions with the Military Police Security Service (MPSS), CFSU Europe and Supreme Headquarters Allied Powers Europe in Casteau, Belgium.

In November 2007 a ceremony officially recognized the CFPM assuming command of the Canadian Forces Military Police Group. This new CF Formation comprises the CFNIS, MPSS, Canadian Forces Service Prison and Detention Barracks (CFSPDB) and Canadian Forces Military Police Academy (CFMPA).

On April 1, 2011, the CF MP Gp was restructured to its current establishment, with the environmental and operational commands policing assets now under the full command of the CF MP Gp Commander. The MPSS and the CFSPDB are now part of the MP Svcs Gp, while the CFNIS and CFMPA remain directly under the CF MP Gp structure.

Today, the Military Police Branch comprises approximately 2,230 members total, inclusive of Reserve members.

Training
The first stage of training for candidates is the 10-week Basic Military Qualification (BMQ) course at the Canadian Forces Leadership and Recruit School in St-Jean-sur-Richelieu, Quebec. This training provides the basic core skills and knowledge common to all trades. A goal of this course is to ensure that all recruits maintain the CF physical fitness standard; as a result, the training is physically demanding. BMQ covers the following topics: policies and regulations of the CF, CF drill, dress and deportment (the "three Ds"), basic safety, first aid, personal survival in nuclear, biological and chemical conditions, handling and firing personal weapons, cross-country navigation and personal survival in field conditions.

Upon successful completion of BMQ, candidates go to a Military Training Centre for the Soldier Qualification (SQ) course, which lasts 20 training days. SQ covers the following topics: Army physical fitness, dismounted offensive and defensive operations, reconnaissance patrolling, advanced weapons-handling (working with grenades, machine-guns and anti-tank weapons) and individual field-craft.

After successful completion of the BMQ and SQ courses, candidates will attend Basic Military Police Training at the Canadian Forces Military Police Academy (CFMPA). Over a four-and-half-month period, they will learn the basics of Canadian civilian and military law, investigative techniques, and acquire skills necessary to perform daily Military Police functions.

As CFMP progress through their careers, they will continually attend training for career and specialty courses at the CFMPA as well as partake in training with other Canadian and US Law Enforcement agencies.

Canadian Forces Military Police Academy
During 1968, the Provost Corps School was renamed the Canadian Forces School of Intelligence and Security (CFSIS). On 1 April 1999, the CFSIS was stood down. The Intelligence Training Company was reformed as the Canadian Forces School of Military Intelligence (CFSMI), located at CFB Kingston.

CFMPA was established 1 April 1999 when the Intelligence Training Company was detached from the former CFSIS. At this time the unit was transformed into a distinct Military Police/Security training establishment.

The Military Police component was reorganized to form the CFMPA and is located at CFB Borden. CFMPA provides career and specialist training to Regular and Reserve Force members of the Military Police Branch. In addition, CFMPA provides security-related training to non-Branch personnel of the Regular and Reserve Forces. CFMPA also provides training to personnel from other government and law enforcement agencies and to foreign nationals under the Military Training Assistance Program.

In 2004 Managing Authority for CFMPA was transferred from Canadian Forces Training Systems Group to the CFPM, who now exercises full control of Career and Out of Service Training for the Military Police.

A new, state of the art training facility, was completed in fall 2015. The CFMPA officially moved into the Col James Riley Stone Building, also located at CFB Borden, on 16 October 2015 and began delivering training in this new facility on 21 October 2015.

Domestic operations and deployments
 The Canadian Forces Military Police serve in policing and security roles on every base and station of the Canadian Forces in Canada, as well as with the various regiments and battalions. CFMP continue to serve with United Nations (UN) forces, as part of the NATO component in Geilenkirchen, Germany, and in 45 Canadian Embassies and High Commissions around the world.

Specific tasks of CFMP may include:

Supporting CF missions around the world, by providing policing and operational support
Enforcing provincial and federal laws and regulations on DND establishments
Investigating and reporting incidents involving military and/or criminal offences
Performing other policing duties, such as traffic control, traffic-accident investigation, emergency response, and liaison with Canadian, allied and other foreign police forces
Developing and applying crime prevention measures to protect military communities against criminal acts
Coordinating tasks related to persons held in custody (including military detainees and prisoners of war)
Providing security at selected Canadian embassies around the world
Providing service to the community through conflict mediation, negotiation, dispute resolution, public relations and victim assistance

Afghanistan

Members of the Canadian Forces Military Police are also involved in the International Security Assistance Force (ISAF), a NATO-led formation that operates in Afghanistan under the authority of the UN. The Canadian Forces' contribution to ISAF is conducted under Operation ATTENTION, and through this operation, CFMP members are primarily based in Kabul, Afghanistan, where they are employed across the city in a variety of training and advisory roles. CFMP members are also stationed with the Canadian Contingent Training Mission – Afghanistan (CCTM-A) Military Police Element, where they are responsible to enforce Canadian Law among the CF personnel and assisting other Military Police of different nations in enforcing conduct and discipline.

Under the former Operation ATHENA, CFMP members were stationed with Task Force Kandahar for the Operational Mentor and Liaison Team (OMLT), Operational Mentor and Advisory Teams (OMATs) and the Police Operational Mentor and Liaison Team (P-OMLT). CFMP also had a unit supporting Task Force Afghanistan.

Canada's Engagement in Afghanistan Official Website – Canada's New Role in Afghanistan – 2011 to 2014

Canada's Engagement in Afghanistan Official Website – Canada's Military and Police Training Role in Afghanistan: 2011-2014

Organization structure
The CFMP operate many units across Canada. Most of the units are "total force" meaning they employ both regular force and primary reserve members of the CF. All units are under the control of the Canadian Forces Military Police Group (CF MP Gp), headquartered in Ottawa, Ontario.

Naval Military Police Group
The Naval Military Police Group (N MP Gp) is a Military Police formation with the mandate to provide policing services to the Navy. The formation comprises a HQ in Ottawa, Ontario, and two subordinate units: Naval MP Unit Esquimalt, and Naval MP Unit Halifax. MPU Ottawa and MPU Borden also fall under the Naval Military Police Group with mandates to provide policing services to Canadian Forces Support Unit Ottawa (CFSU(O)) and Canadian Forces Base Borden/Canadian Forces Training Support Group (CFB Borden CFTSG) respectively.
Military Police Unit Ottawa – Ottawa, ON
Military Police Unit Borden – CFB Borden
Military Police Unit Esquimalt – CFB Esquimalt
Military Police Unit Halifax – CFB Halifax

Canadian Army Military Police Group
The Canadian Army Military Police Group (CA MP Gp) is a Military Police formation with the mandate to provide policing services to the Army. The formation comprises a HQ in Ottawa, and four subordinate units: 1 Military Police Regiment (1 MP Regt) with HQ located in at CFB Edmonton, 2 MP Regt with HQ located in Toronto, Ontario, 3 MP Regt with HQ in Sackville, Nova Scotia and 5 MP Regt with HQ at CFB Valcartier.

1 Military Police Regiment
1 Military Police Regiment Headquarters – CFB Edmonton
15 Military Police Company – CFB Edmonton
1 Military Police Platoon (Regular Force) - CFB Edmonton
11 Military Police Platoon (Reserve Force) - Edmonton, Alberta
12 Military Police Platoon (Reserve Force) – Richmond, British Columbia and Victoria, British Columbia
13 Military Police Platoon (Reserve Force) – Winnipeg, Manitoba
14 Military Police Platoon (Reserve Force) – Calgary, Alberta
10 Military Police Company – CFB Edmonton
Yellowknife Military Police Detachment
Chilliwack Military Police Detachment – 39 Canadian Brigade Group
CFB Shilo Military Police Platoon – CFB Shilo
CFB Suffield Military Police Platoon – CFB/ASU Suffield
ASU Wainwright Military Police Platoon – CFB/ASU Wainwright

2 Military Police Regiment
Military Police Regiment Headquarters – Toronto, Ontario
2 Military Police Platoon – CFB Petawawa
2 Military Police Company (Reserve Force) – Toronto, Ontario
31 Military Police Platoon (Reserve Force) – London, Ontario
32 Military Police Platoon (Reserve Force) – Toronto, Ontario
33 Military Police Platoon (Reserve Force) – Ottawa, Ontario
ASU Petawawa Military Police Platoon – CFB/ASU Petawawa
ASU Kingston Military Police Platoon – CFB/ASU Kingston
ASU Northern Ontario Military Police Detachment – CFB North Bay
ASU Toronto Military Police Section – ASU Toronto
ASU London Military Police Detachment – ASU London
LFCA TC Meaford Military Police Section – LFCA Training Centre Meaford

3 Military Police Regiment
3 Military Police Regiment Headquarters – Bedford, Nova Scotia
30 Military Police Company (Reserve Force) – Bedford, Nova Scotia
301 Military Police Platoon (Reserve Force) – Bedford, Nova Scotia
302 Military Police Platoon (Reserve Force) – Bedford, Nova Scotia
303 Military Police Platoon (Reserve Force) – Moncton, New Brunswick
ASU Gagetown Military Police Platoon – CFB/ASU Gagetown

5 Military Police Regiment
5 Military Police Regiment Headquarters – CFB Valcartier
5 Military Police Platoon – CFB Valcartier
4 Military Police Company – Quebec City, Quebec
41 Military Police Platoon (Reserve Force) – Montreal, Quebec
42 Military Police Platoon (Reserve Force) – Quebec City, Quebec
43 Military Police Platoon (Reserve Force) – Jonquière, Quebec
ASU Valcartier Military Police Platoon – CFB/ASU Valcatier
ASU Saint-Jean Military Police Section – Saint-Jean-sur-Richelieu, Quebec

Air Force Military Police Group
The Air Force Military Police Group (AF MP Gp) is a Military Police formation with the mandate to provide policing services to the Air Force. The formation comprises a HQ at CFB Winnipeg, and two subordinate units: 1 Military Police Squadron (MP Sqn) with HQ in Cold Lake and 2 MP Sqn with HQ at CFB Trenton.

1 Military Police Squadron
1 Military Police Squadron Headquarters – 4 Wing Cold Lake
11 Military Police Flight – 4 Wing Cold Lake
12 Military Police Flight – 19 Wing Comox
13 Military Police Flight – 17 Wing Detachment Dundurn
14 Military Police Flight – 15 Wing Moose Jaw
17 Military Police Flight – 17 Wing Winnipeg

2 Military Police Squadron
2 Military Police Squadron Headquarters – CFB Trenton
21 Military Police Flight – CFB Trenton
22 Military Police Flight – CFB North Bay
23 Military Police Flight – CFB Bagotville
24 Military Police Flight – CFB Greenwood
25 Military Police Flight – CFB Goose Bay
29 Military Police Flight – CFB Gander

Special Operations Forces Military Police Unit
The SOF MPU is a Military Police unit with the mandate to provide policing services to the Canadian Special Operations Forces Command (CANSOFCOM).

Military Police Services Group
The Military Police Services Group (MP Svcs Gp) is a Military Police formation with the mandate to provide MP operational support to Canadian Forces operations, domestic, continental or expeditionary. The formation comprises a HQ in Ottawa, and three subordinate units: the CF Close Protection Unit (CFCPU), the Military Police Security Service (MPSS), and the CF Service Prison and Detention Barracks (CFSPDB).

Canadian Forces Protective Services Unit
The CFPSU is a high-readiness, specialized and expert protective service organization capable of conducting a broad range of special protective missions and tasks at home and abroad in support of the DND and CF mission. The CFPSU HQ is located in Ottawa.

Military Police Security Service
The MPSS is as a unit of the MP Svcs Gp seconded to the Department of Foreign Affairs and International Trade (DFAIT). The role of the MPSS is to provide security services to specific Canadian Foreign Missions and related properties under the direction of the appropriate Head of Mission. These services include protection of classified and administratively controlled material and equipment, Canadian personnel and property. The performance of these duties includes the execution of instructions for the protection of Canadian Foreign Service Missions and their personnel in emergencies.

The MPSS employs over a hundred Military Police personnel. The MPSS personnel are located at the unit headquarters, in Ottawa, and at 47 Canadian Embassies, High Commissions, or Consulates around the world.

The first embassy to employ MP personnel as Military Security Guards was Beirut, Lebanon in 1976. The Military Security Guard Unit (MSGU) was declared an official unit of the CF in 1990, and was officially renamed the MPSS in 2009.

CF Service Prison and Detention Barracks

Originally established as one of several military detention centres, the CFSPDB, located at CFB Edmonton, is now the sole, permanently established military corrections facility remaining in the CF. The roles of the CFSPDB include: provide imprisonment and detention services for Canadian Forces service detainees, service prisoners and service convicts; to adjust detainees and prisoners to service discipline, and prepare them to resume an effective role in the CF; to return prisoners to civilian life, where appropriate, with improved attitude and motivation; and to provide subject matter expertise and guidance in support of Canadian Forces disciplinary programs and deployed prisoner of war/detainee operations.

Inmates at the CFSPDB serve sentences that range from 15–90 days of detention, to sentences of imprisonment up to two years less a day. Inmates serving a sentence of 14 days' detention, or less, may serve their sentence at a local Unit Detention Room.

Other detachments and specialty units
Canadian Forces National Counter-Intelligence Unit

The CFNCIU is responsible to provide Security Intelligence (SI) and Counter Intelligence (CI) services in support of the CF and the DND during peace, crisis and war. The mission of the CFNCIU consists in identifying, investigating and countering threats to the security of the CF and the DND from foreign intelligence services, or from individuals/groups engaged of espionage, sabotage, subversion, terrorism, extremism or criminal activities. The CFNCIU is a national level, specialist unit responsible for the provision of counter-intelligence (specifically counter-HUMINT) services to the CF and the DND. In addition, the CFNCIU is responsible for the Defensive Security Briefing and Debriefing Program. This program is designed to provide knowledge and assistance to assist CF and DND members in protecting themselves and the Department from potential threats involved in foreign travel, either for Duty or Non-Duty travel, or who may have or have contact with foreign nationals.

The CFNCIU contains both military police and intelligence operators and liaise often with the Canadian Security Intelligence Service (CSIS), the Royal Canadian Mounted Police (RCMP) and provincial and municipal police service intelligence officers when gathering and sharing information.

Canadian Forces National Investigation Service

The CFNIS investigates serious or sensitive service and criminal offences against property, persons, and the Department of National Defence. It performs a function similar to that of a Major Crime unit of the RCMP or large municipal police agency.

1 Canadian Air Division VIP Aircraft Security Detail (Air Marshal detail)
Military Police members of the 1 Can Air Div VIP Aircraft Security Detail, are responsible for providing security to Canadian Forces aircraft, crew and passengers—passengers who may include the Governor General, the Prime Minister and members of the Royal Family, amongst others.

The Canadian Forces Military Police also operate detachments at the following units
Canadian Forces Support Unit (Europe)
Royal Military College of Canada – CFB Kingston
CFSRSHQ Det Augsburg, Germany
CFNA HQ Yellowknife
Supreme Headquarters Allied Powers Europe – Casteau, Belgium

Fleet and equipment
CFMP patrol vehicles are painted white with two red stripes and police logo. CFMP Reserve and regular field units have trucks painted military green that say "Military Police Militaire" and have a red topper light. Because of the terrain on certain bases, some units also have bicycles, all-terrain vehicles (ATV), snowmobiles and watercraft.

Order of precedence

See also

Department of National Defence (Canada)
Intelligence Branch
Canadian Special Operations Forces Command
Military Police Complaints Commission

References

External links
Canadian Forces Provost Marshal
Canadian Military Police Association
Canadian Forces Military Police NCM Recruiting
Canadian Forces Military Police Officer Recruiting
Canadian Military Police Virtual Museum
Military Police Complaints Commission of Canada
Canadian Forces Recruiting
Canadian Forces and Department of National Defence
Canadian Forces Military Police Kit Shop

Canadian Armed Forces personnel branches
1967 establishments in Canada
Gendarmerie
Uniformed services of Canada
Federal law enforcement agencies of Canada
Military provosts of Canada